Rosenbad (lit. "rosen bath") is a building in central Stockholm, precinct of Norrmalm. It is a building owned by the Swedish State and serves as the seat of the Government. The present government of Sweden is the right-leaning Kristersson Cabinet.

Rosenbad is located on Strömgatan on the north side of the river Norrström. It was designed by Art Nouveau architect Ferdinand Boberg, and completed in 1902. It originally housed a variety of functions, including a restaurant (until 1956) of the same name. Renovation of the entire block began in autumn 2018, and is expected to be completed in spring 2023. In the meantime, the Government Offices are housed in surrounding blocks.

Government building
Rosenbad now functions as the seat for Prime Minister's Office and the Government Offices. It is located close to the Sager House, the official residence of the Prime Minister. The Riksdag building and the Royal Palace are located across the waters of Stockholms ström.

See also
Architecture of Stockholm
Government of Sweden
Politics of Sweden

External links

Official website

References 

Buildings and structures in Stockholm
Government buildings in Sweden
Commercial buildings completed in 1902
Government of Sweden
Art Nouveau architecture in Stockholm
Art Nouveau government buildings
Art Nouveau commercial buildings
1902 establishments in Sweden
Office buildings in Sweden